Santa Reyes known professionally as Santaye, is a Dominican singer-songwriter based in Miami. She began her music career in 2010. Several of Santaye's singles have charted on US Billboard Tropical Songs. She was twice nominated for the Lo Nuestro Award for Tropical Female Artist of the Year.

Early life 
Reyes is from Baní, Dominican Republic. She has eight brothers. She was timid as a child, but frequently sang at schools and family reunions. When Santaye was seven, she moved to Miami. She wrote her first song when she was twelve years old. After graduating from college, she moved to New York.

Career 
Santaye began her career in 2010. She sings bachata in English and Spanish. When asked where her professional name derived from, Santaye responded that it comes from the "la diosa de los planetas para pacificar." Her first album was produced by Dan Warner and Lee Levin. She released the single "Eras Tu" in December 2012. Her single, "Invito a Quereme" was produced by Lenny Santos. In July 2013, Santaye released "In My Head," a single produced by Lenny Santos. Between November 2013 and January 2014, she recorded its music video. She signed a management deal with Aquos Entertainment.

Artistry 
Santaye has a romantic style of singing. Univision calls her style a fusion of pop, ballad, and bachata. She cites Rocío Dúrcal, Alejandra Guzmán, Pink and Thalía as influences on her style.

Discography

Studio albums 

Corazón (2011)

Singles

Awards and nominations 

|-
| 2012
| Herself
| Lo Nuestro Award for Tropical Female Artist of the Year
| 
|-
| 2015
| Herself
| Lo Nuestro Award for Tropical Female Artist of the Year
|

Personal life 
Santaye resides in Miami, Florida. She is a christian.

References 

Living people
Spanish-language singers of the United States
American bachata musicians
21st-century Dominican Republic women singers
American women pop singers
American writers of Dominican Republic descent
Hispanic and Latino American musicians
21st-century American women writers
American women singer-songwriters
Musicians from Miami
American Latin pop singers
Latin music songwriters
People from Baní
Singer-songwriters from Florida
Dominican Republic emigrants to the United States
Christians from Florida
Year of birth missing (living people)
Hispanic and Latino American women singers
Women in Latin music
Bachata singers